Kettikaran is a 1971 Indian Tamil-language action film, directed by H. S. Venu. The film stars Jaishankar, Leela, Nagesh and Major Sundarrajan.

Cast 
 Jaishankar
 Leela
 Nagesh
 Major Sundarrajan
 S. A. Ashokan (guest role)
 Jayakumari
 Kallapart Natarajan
 Sachu (guest role)
 P. R. Varalakshmi
 Nalini
 Vijayarekha
 Pushpa
 Ranchana

Soundtrack

References

External links 
 

1970s Tamil-language films
1971 action films
Indian action films